The Primera Nacional Femenina de Fútbol is the fourth tier of league competition for Spanish women's football. It is the female equivalent of the men's Segunda División RFEF and is run by the Real Federación Española de Fútbol.

History
The league was created in 2001, with the inception of the new Superliga Femenina, composed by only group instead of the four of the previous seasons.

Since 2011, teams were divided in seven groups by geographical criteria.

Group 1: Asturias, Cantabria and Galicia.
Group 2: Basque Country, La Rioja and Navarre.
Group 3: Aragon, Balearic Islands and Catalonia.
Group 4: Andalusia, Ceuta, Extremadura and Melilla.
Group 5: Castile and León, Castile-La Mancha and Community of Madrid.
Group 6: Canary Islands.
Group 7: Region of Murcia and Valencian Community.

The league was renamed as the Primera Nacional de Fútbol in 2019 after the RFEF renamed the new division between it and the first tier as Segunda División Pro, after initially naming it Primera División B.

In early 2022, it was confirmed that the league structure would be altered again, after only three seasons: the existing Primera División would be a standalone professional league of 16 teams, a single nationwide 16-team division known as the Primera Federación would be created as the second tier, the existing Segunda División Pro of 32 teams (two regionalised 16-team groups) would become the third tier and be named the Segunda Federación, and the existing Primera Nacional division of 96 teams (six regionalised 16-team groups) would become the fourth tier. These levels would be administered by the RFEF and more closely resemble the men's post-2021 structure, albeit only one professional league and six fourth-tier groups rather than five.

2022–23 teams

Group 1
Deportivo L.C. B
Gijón FF
Llanera	
Lóstrego
Mos	
Oceja-Gimnástica
Olímpico de León
Parquesol B
R. Avilés
R. Oviedo B	
Romanón	
Sporting Gijón
Umia
Victoria CF
Victoria FC

Group 2
Arratia	
Aurrerá Vitoria
Añorga
Berriozar
Burgos	
Eibar B
Logroño B
Monte
Mulier
Oiartzun
Pradejón B
Racing Sant. B
Real Sociedad B
San Ignacio
Tolosa
UD Logroñés

Group 3
Algaidas
Castellón
Collerense
Cornellà
Ejea
Fontsanta Fatjó	
Huesca	
Riudoms
Sant Gabriel
Santa Ponsa T.
Seagull
Son Sardina
Stadium Casablanca
Vic Riuprimer
Villarreal B
Zaragoza B

Group 4
Atlético Lince
Atlético Madrid C
Daimiel	
Dinamo Guadalajara
Extremadura
Fútbolellas
Madrid CFF C
Olympia Las Rozas
Olímpico Madrid	
Pozuelo Alarcón
Rayo Vallecano B
Salamanca
Samper
Santa Teresa B
Sport Extremadura

Group 5
Alba B
Aldaia
Ciudad Alcalá
Ciudad de Murcia
Cádiz
Discóbolo La Torre
Elche	
Granada B
La Rambla
Levante C
Mislata
Murcia Féminas	
Málaga City
Plaza Argel
San Vicente
Sevilla B

Group 6
Achamán	
Atl. Perdoma
FCD Tenerife B
Firgas
Geneto del Teide
Guiniguada Ap.
Güímar	
Julio Suárez
Las Majoreras
Orientación M.
Peña la Amistad
Puerto del Carmen
Real Unión Ten. B
San Antonio Pureza
Tarsa

Promoted teams 
This table shows the group winners and the promoted teams.

As second tier

As third tier

References

External links
Primera Nacional Femenina de Fútbol on RFEF 
Leagues on women.soccerway.com 
Group 7(English)
Primera Nacional Femenina de Fútbol on Futbolme 

 
3
Spain